"To Know You Is to Love You" is a song written by Syreeta Wright and Stevie Wonder in 1972.

The duet was first released on Syreeta Wright's debut album (Syreeta, MW 113) by MoWest Records (a Motown company) in 1972.

B.B. King recording
It is also a single and an album by B.B. King, released by ABC Records in 1973, with the title song co-interpreted with Stevie Wonder (track B1 on the album To Know You Is to Love You).  In the US, this version went to #12 on the Hot Soul Singles chart and #38 on the Hot 100.

See also
A song with the same title is actually renamed from Phil Spector's "To Know Him Is to Love Him", whose covers occasionally change the lyrics and the title to "To Know You Is To Love You" (Bobby Vinton, Peter and Gordon, Gary Glitter) or to To Know Her Is To Love Her (The Beatles 1962 Decca audition recording, released 1994; John Lennon 1973 recording, released 1986).

References

External links
 
 

1972 songs
1973 singles
Songs written by Stevie Wonder
Songs written by Syreeta Wright
Syreeta Wright songs
Male–female vocal duets